Unaksan is a mountain in Gyeonggi-do, South Korea. Its area extends across the county of Gapyeong and the city Pocheon.

See also
 List of mountains in Korea

Notes

References
 

Mountains of South Korea
Mountains of Gyeonggi Province